Natalie Anne Prystajecky a Canadian biologist and the Environmental Microbiology program at the British Columbia Centre for Disease Control Public Health Laboratory. She holds a Clinical Assistant Professor position at the University of British Columbia. During the COVID-19 pandemic Prystajecky was involved with the development COVID-19 testing capabilities.

Early life and education 
Prystajecky studied environmental science and biology at the University of Calgary. She moved to British Columbia as a graduate student, where she first worked toward a certificate in watershed management. In 2010 Prystajecky earned her doctoral degree at the University of British Columbia. Her research considered epidemiological studies of Giardia spp.

Research and career 
After completing her doctorate, Prystajecky joined the British Columbia Provincial Health Services Authority, where she led British Columbians through outbreaks of norovirus and influenza. At the time, Prystajecky's advice was to “wash your hands all the time, and soap and water is the best,”.

Prystajecky leads the Environmental Microbiology program at the British Columbia Centre for Disease Control Public Health Laboratory. She investigates the relationship between environmental exposures and clinical outcomes. To do this, Prystajecky developed technology for genome sequencing. She has used these genomic technologies to search for pathogens that might cause foodborne illnesses. Prystajecky has used metagenomics to test for bacteria and viruses in water in an effort to improve the health of people and ecosystems.

In early 2020 Prystajecky was involved in two British Columbian oyster One Health studies named UPCOAST-V for Vibrio parahaemolyticus and UPCOAST-N for Norovirus,   Improved detection of the viruses will help to reduce the spread of disease and help the Canadian oyster industry. 

During the COVID-19 pandemic Prystajecky was involved with the development COVID-19 testing capabilities. The first quantitative PCR acid was shared by researchers in Wuhan with World Health Organization, and forms the basis of many COVID-19 tests, including those developed by Prystajecky. In particular, Prystajecky looked to reduce the time taken between testing and obtaining results in an effort to understand transmission and protect vulnerable members of the population. The British Columbia Centre for Disease Control program that conducts the testing is known as Responding to Emerging Serious Pathogen Outbreaks using Next-gen Data (RESPOND), and makes use of genome sequencing to identify which patients have been infected by the disease.

Selected publications

Personal life 
Prystajecky has two children.

References 

Living people
Year of birth missing (living people)
Canadian women biologists
Pathogen genomics
University of Calgary alumni
University of British Columbia alumni
Public health researchers
21st-century Canadian biologists
21st-century Canadian women scientists